The Brown Line (formerly route 52) was a branch of the Pittsburgh Light Rail system that ran from South Hills Junction over Mount Washington and across the Monongahela River to downtown Pittsburgh, terminating at Gateway Center.  It included the steepest grade of any section of the Pittsburgh light rail system, of approximately 10 percent.

History

The 52 Allentown route was created in 1984 by renaming what was then the 49 Arlington-Warrington, itself created in 1971 by combining portions of the 48 Arlington and 49 Beltzhoover lines. In April 2010 the 52 Allentown was rebranded the "Brown Line" by the Port Authority.

Prior to being discontinued, Brown Line service was severely reduced, operating only during Monday to Friday rush hours, with bus route 44 substitute providing service at other times.  The Port Authority considered ending all Brown Line service, but this would have provided only limited savings unless the tracks and overhead wires were also decommissioned.  More importantly, however, the Brown Line's tracks provided an alternate route when the Mt. Washington Transit Tunnel was closed (either due to planned maintenance or a stalled vehicle), allowing Red Line or Blue Line services to continue operating, albeit behind schedule since the Allentown routing took five to eight minutes longer than via the tunnel.

On March 27, 2011, the Brown Line service was withdrawn due to a system-wide 15% service cut.

The line is still used occasionally by Blue and Red line trains when the Mt. Washington Transit Tunnel is closed 

As of February 2021, The Port Authority's newly released 25-year plan includes the possibility of reviving service on the Allentown line due to continuing growth of the neighborhood.

Route
The Brown Line was much shorter and ran less frequently than the Red and Blue Lines. It provided service to the Allentown neighborhood of Pittsburgh, Pennsylvania, where dense housing and the hilly terrain make automobile transportation difficult—some area streets cannot be used at all during the winter.  The route began at South Hills Junction, climbing upwards to Haberman and East Warrington Avenue. It continued along Warrington in an easterly direction until turning left onto Arlington Avenue, where it followed the sharply curving street northwards, over the shoulder of Mount Washington. At the intersection of McArdle Roadway it swung onto private right-of-way to reach the Panhandle Bridge (also used by the Red and Blue Lines) to cross the Monongahela River and gain entry to downtown, stopping at First Avenue, Steel Plaza, Wood Street, and Gateway Center. The entire line operated within the city of Pittsburgh.

References

External links 
Brown Line - Allentown schedule effective April 4, 2010
Brown Line - Allentown Route Map
Supplementary Bus Service to Allentown via bus route 46K - Schedule

Port Authority of Allegheny County
5 ft 2½ in gauge railways in the United States
Light rail in Pennsylvania